Bare-ye Pooz Qaribabad Motor-e Ebrahim is a village in Dumak Rural District, in the Nosratabad of Zahedan County, Sistan and Baluchestan Province, Iran. At the 2006 census, its population was 114, in 21 families.

References 

Populated places in Zahedan County